Alexis Mbongo Tekumu (born 20 July 1982) is a Congolese retired footballer.

Career

Belgium

Introduced at WS Woluwe over the course of winter 2007/08, Tekumu opened his goal account with Les Étoilés that January, stating that their goal was promotion. Desiring to leave by the middle of May, he was dismissed shortly afterwards.

Malta

Debuting as Hibernians overwhelmed 4-0 on the 31st of August 2008, the Congolese international was punished with a suspension as the Paolites held Valletta 1-1, returning two weeks later. However, when allowed to spend one week at home in Switzerland, he did not go back to Malta, one of the repercussion of personal problems back home.

References

External links 
 at National-Football-Teams
 at Soccerway

Association football forwards
Living people
Maltese Premier League players
Expatriate footballers in Belgium
CS Chênois players
Democratic Republic of the Congo footballers
Swiss men's footballers
Swiss expatriate footballers
Association football wingers
Association football midfielders
Hibernians F.C. players
Expatriate footballers in Malta
Étoile Carouge FC players
Democratic Republic of the Congo expatriate footballers
1982 births
Democratic Republic of the Congo international footballers
21st-century Democratic Republic of the Congo people
Democratic Republic of the Congo expatriate sportspeople in Switzerland
Democratic Republic of the Congo expatriate sportspeople in Malta